Alejandro Murguía (born August 15, 1949) is an American poet, short story writer, and editor. He is known for his writings about the San Francisco's Mission District.

He lives in San Francisco, where he teaches at San Francisco State University. In 2012, he was named San Francisco Poet Laureate.

Awards
 1991, 2003 American Book Award
 2012 San Francisco Poet Laureate

Works

Anthologies

References

External links

1949 births
Living people
20th-century American poets
San Francisco State University faculty
American writers of Mexican descent
Poets Laureate of San Francisco
21st-century American poets
20th-century American short story writers
21st-century American short story writers
American Book Award winners
Californios